COS-B was the first European Space Research Organisation (ESRO) mission to study cosmic gamma ray sources. COS-B was first put forward by the European scientific community in the mid-1960s and approved by the ESRO council in 1969. The mission consisted of a satellite containing gamma-ray detectors, which was launched by NASA on behalf of the ESRO on 9 August 1975. The mission was completed on 25 April 1982, after the satellite had been operational for more than 6.5 years, four years longer than planned and had increased the amount of data on gamma rays by a factor of 25. Scientific results included the 2CG Catalogue listing around 25 gamma ray sources and a map of the Milky Way. The satellite also observed the X-ray binary Cygnus X-3.

Launch 

COS-B was launched from Vandenberg Air Force Base on 9 August 1975 on a Delta 2913 rocket.

External links 

 Cos-B overview at esa.int
 Cos-B overview at ESA science & technology pages
 Scientific results of Cos-B at ESA
 Cos-B overview at NASA

European Space Agency satellites
Space telescopes
1975 in spaceflight
Gamma-ray telescopes
Spacecraft launched in 1975